"Black Maps and Motel Rooms" is the seventh episode of the second season of the American anthology crime drama television series True Detective. It is the 15th overall episode of the series and was written by series creator Nic Pizzolatto, and directed by Daniel Attias. It was first broadcast on HBO in the United States on August 2, 2015.

The season is set in California, and focuses on three detectives, Ray Velcoro (Colin Farrell), Ani Bezzerides (Rachel McAdams) and Paul Woodrugh (Taylor Kitsch), from three cooperating police departments and a criminal-turned-businessman named Frank Semyon (Vince Vaughn) as they investigate a series of crimes they believe are linked to the murder of a corrupt politician. In the episode, Velcoro, Bezzerides and Woodrugh use the information they obtained to finally connect all cases, while Semyon sets out to take care of his loyalties.

According to Nielsen Media Research, the episode was seen by an estimated 2.18 million household viewers and gained a 1.0 ratings share among adults aged 18–49. The episode received very positive reviews from critics, who praised the performances, character development and ending.

Plot
After escaping from the mansion, Velcoro (Colin Farrell), Bezzerides (Rachel McAdams), Woodrugh (Taylor Kitsch) and Vera (Miranda Rae Mayo) stay at a motel. Bezzerides is panicked after the events that she seeks comfort in Velcoro, but he rebuffs her advances. Velcoro and Woodrugh check the stolen documents, which link Catalast and McCandless (Jon Lindstrom) to Osip (Timothy V. Murphy). During this, Woodrugh is privately sent pictures of his sexual encounter with Miguel, via an unknown number. 

Velcoro visits Semyon (Vince Vaughn) at his casino to disclose information on the people involved at the mansion, revealing Osip's role. Semyon in return reveals Irina's death and that she contacted a police officer for information. Velcoro meets with Davis (Michael Hyatt) to disclose the new information but is shocked to discover her dead. Woodrugh moves Emily (Adria Arjona) and Cynthia (Lolita Davidovich) out of the city while Bezzerides does the same with Athena (Leven Rambin) and Eliot (David Morse), putting them in care of Ilinca (Michael Irby). Bezzerides also asks Vera about the diamonds, where she identifies some people involved for a woman being tortured at the shed in Guerneville.

Woodrugh retrieves information from the police department, discovering that Burris (James Frain) and Dixon were involved in meeting with Irina. He also discovers that Bezzerides is wanted for questioning for killing the guard at the mansion and they later find that Velcoro is a suspect in Davis' murder. Using the information that Velcoro provided, Semyon brutally attacks Blake (Christopher James Baker), who confesses to conspiring with Osip and Tony Chessani but claims that no one knows who killed Caspere. He confesses to killing Stan and reveals that Osip and McCandless are meeting at Ojai, where Osip will pay for Caspere's shares. He also warns him that they have bought the loyalty of all of his henchmen, with the exception of Nails (Chris Kerson) and offers to work as a double agent for him. Semyon is not interested and kills Blake.

Back at the motel room, Velcoro, Bezzerides and Woodrugh conclude that during the 1992 Los Angeles riots, Burris, Holloway (Afemo Omilami), Dixon and Caspere worked together to steal diamonds, which they used to buy into the Vinci power structure. This explains the supposed robbery at Caspere's house, as they were looking for the diamonds. However, they are still unsure on who killed Caspere; neither Burris, Holloway or Dixon would do it as it would draw attention to them. Woodrugh is once again contacted by the stranger, claiming that they need to meet or he will leak the pictures, forcing him to leave the motel.

Semyon asks Jordan (Kelly Reilly) to pack her stuff and leave for now, with Nails accompanying her. Semyon then starts getting money, tickets, new IDs, cars, and weapons, intending for them to flee to Venezuela. He also meets with Chessani (Ritchie Coster), informing him of Tony's partnership with Osip and McCandless. He is also approached by Osip, who claims that he is buying the casino and offers him a position working for him, something that Semyon goes along with it. Later, Semyon evacuates the casino on a false alarm, kills one of Osip's guards and burns down the casino and some other properties. 

Woodrugh informs Velcoro that he must deal with the blackmail and goes to the location, where Miguel (Gabriel Luna) leads him to meet Holloway, the person responsible for the blackmail. He is led to a group of men from Black Mountain private security led by Holloway, who asks for the documents, to which he says he could call Velcoro to get them. As he tries to call, he attacks Holloway and holds him at gunpoint. He knocks him out and starts running as his henchmen shoot at him. Back at the motel room, Velcoro and Bezzerides share their frustrations and they have sex.

Woodrugh evades some of the hitmen, killing all of them, using Miguel as a human shield. He uses many routes to escape the location and get signal for the phone. Just as he is leaving, Burris shoots him in the back and then in the head, killing him. Burris then leaves in a car, leaving Woodrugh's corpse behind.

Production

Development
In June 2015, the episode's title was revealed as "Black Maps and Motel Rooms" and it was announced that series creator Nic Pizzolatto had written the episode while Daniel Attias had directed it. This was Pizzolatto's fifteenth writing credit, and Attias' first directing credit.

Reception

Viewers
The episode was watched by 2.18 million viewers, earning a 1.0 in the 18-49 rating demographics on the Nielson ratings scale. This means that 1 percent of all households with televisions watched the episode. This was a 7% decrease from the previous episode, which was watched by 2.34 million viewers with a 1.0 in the 18-49 demographics.

Critical reviews
"Black Maps and Motel Rooms" received very positive reviews from critics. The review aggregator website Rotten Tomatoes reported a 84% approval rating for the episode, based on 25 reviews, with an average rating of 7.95/10. The site's consensus states: "Tense and tightly paced, 'Black Maps and Motel Rooms' finds the disparate -- and often vague -- strands of True Detective coming into sharper focus."

Matt Fowler of IGN gave the episode a "great" 8.5 out of 10 and wrote in his verdict, "True Detective put the screws to our heroes this week, placing them, for the first time in this season, in the crosshairs of the various villains pulling the strings behind the scenes. Sure, they'd all stumbled before. But that was either due to their own personal demons or the half-season street shootout that was designed to cause chaos/upend their careers. Here, they were lost and scared. Scrambling to figure out their next move. And down came Paul, whose own dark private security past came back to find him."

Erik Adams of The A.V. Club gave the episode an "A-" grade and wrote, "True Detective season two wants you to be watching the whole chessboard at all times, but it's playing chess by mail — you have to wait at least seven days to find out what meaning (if any) the previous move had, and the entire game lasts two months. Unfortunately, it's only in the last two weeks that the show has delivered anything that makes the next move worth anticipating. With Ani and Ray on the lam, Paul potentially out of the picture, and Frank watching his world burn, 'Black Maps And Motel Rooms' sets up one explosive checkmate." 

Alan Sepinwall of HitFix wrote, "For a while, I've just been waiting for the story to end so we can move onto the next season in the hopes that the show can rebound. This episode doesn't retroactively fix the myriad issues with the earlier episodes, but it at least has me curious to see the conclusion of the story for its own sake, and not simply as an excuse to be done with it." Gwilym Mumford of The Guardian wrote, "The jittery momentum builds as the series’s climax comes into view, and at last we actually care about the fates of our true detectives." Ben Travers of IndieWire gave the episode a "B+" grade and wrote, "There's plenty of ground to cover in Episode 8. Hopefully it will be done with a similar sense of urgency."

Darren Franich of Entertainment Weekly wrote, "My new theory is that True Detective season 2 isn't a failed drama. It's successful pro-drug propaganda. The subtext to every episode is: 'Look how much more interesting these boring people are when they take drugs!'" Aaron Riccio of Slant Magazine wrote, "The problem with mysteries, especially fair-play ones, is that if you've paid close enough attention and solved it ahead of schedule, then a table-setting episode like 'Black Maps and Hotels Rooms', in which characters constantly explain how the pieces fit together, is nothing short of irritating. That's because solving a jigsaw puzzle, for instance, can never be as satisfying as the act of physically putting it together. That, of course, is just one perspective, and the real heart of the episode comes from the constant reminder that we all have different needs and wants." 

Kenny Herzog of Vulture gave the episode a 4 star rating out of 5 and wrote, "At least we'll all know soon enough what everyone on this hotly debated True Detective season takes with them and leaves behind, now that only one chapter remains." Tony Sokol of Den of Geek gave the episode a perfect 5 star rating out of 5 and wrote, "'Black Maps and Motel Rooms' was a dense and satisfying and upheld the HBO tradition that no one is safe on their series. The true detectives on True Detective follow black maps and real estate contracts as they untangle an intensely complicated web of intrigue that led to a fairly simple crime: A 23-year old robbery and double homicide." 

Carissa Pavlica of TV Fanatic gave the episode a 3 star rating out of 5 and wrote, "If you were holding your breath, hoping that 'Black Maps and Motel Rooms' was going to raise the stakes and lead us into one hell of a finale, you were sadly mistaken. It was a swing and a miss this season, drama fans. We already knew that, but it's in our nature to hold out hope until the final inning, isn't it? Sorry, waiting for the finale isn't going to cut it. This was the make it or break it installment, and since they were still introducing new elements of the 'mystery' that only made things more confusing, I'm cutting my losses." Shane Ryan gof Paste gave the episode a 9.1 out of 10 and wrote, "Call it hope, and 'Black Maps and Hotel Rooms' was the episode where our hope paid off."

References

External links
 "Black Maps and Motel Rooms" at HBO
 

2015 American television episodes
Television episodes directed by Dan Attias
Television episodes written by Nic Pizzolatto
True Detective episodes